is a Japanese former professional sumo wrestler from Annaka, Gunma. He made his professional debut in March 1984, and his highest rank was maegashira 2. He retired in 2002, and in 2010 became the head coach of Minato stable.

Career
At junior high school he was a member of the judo club but also practiced sumo at the Takasaki city's Tokyo Agricultural University High School, where he was advised to join Minato stable by a supervisor there. He was also inspired to give sumo a try by the example of fellow Gunma Prefecture native Tochiakagi, who in 1977 had become the first wrestler from the prefecture to reach the top division in 65 years. He was given the shikona of Minatofuji immediately and fought his first bout in March 1984. He reached sekitori status for the first time in January 1992 upon promotion to the jūryō division. He was the first member of Minato stable to become a sekitori.  He won the jūryō division yusho or tournament championship in May 1993 with a 12-3 record and was promoted to the top makuuchi division for the following tournament in July 1993.  His highest rank was maegashira 2, which he reached in September 1995. He won his only sansho, or special prize for Fighting Spirit in November 1995. He earned three kinboshi or gold stars for defeating yokozuna, two against Takanohana in January and May 1998 and one against Musashimaru in September 1999. He fought in the top division for 46 tournaments but never managed to reach the sanyaku ranks or score better than 9-6 in a tournament. His win/loss record in makuuchi was 302 wins against 371 losses with 17 absences. He was relatively injury-free until late in his career when an ankle problem caused him pull out of the March 2000 tournament. The injury continued to trouble him and contributed to his demotion to the jūryō division after the March 2001 tournament.

Retirement from sumo
Minatofuji retired in September 2002, and had his danpatsu-shiki or official retirement ceremony in September 2003. He became an elder of the Japan Sumo Association under the name Tatsutagawa (which he purchased from the former Shikishima) and in 2010 took over the running of Minato stable from his former stablemaster, ex-komusubi Yutakayama Hiromitsu, who was approaching the mandatory retirement age. He is now known as Minato Oyakata. He is a judge of tournament bouts, and in September 2013 suffered a fractured ankle when a wrestler fell from the dohyo and landed on him.

In December 2020, he tested positive for COVID-19.

In December 2022 the Sumo Association issued Minatofuji a 20% salary cut for three months after it was discovered that a member of his stable, Ichinojō, violated COVID rules by visiting restaurants in November 2020 and August 2021 when sumo wrestlers were not permitted to go out.

Fighting style
The softness of his physique was noted by Konishiki, who nicknamed him "Marshmallow Man". This and the strength of his legs enabled him to absorb his opponent's charge and counter-attack with pushes and thrusts (tsuki/oshi). When fighting on the mawashi he used a migi-yotsu grip and his favourite technique was shitatenage (underarm throw).

Personal life
Minatofuji was married in 2001 to a physician from Fukushima Prefecture. They met at Saitama Medical University, where she was a graduate student and he happened to be visiting the hospital to see a fellow wrestler (Daishi) who was receiving treatment. Since he took over Minato stable in 2010 she helps him run the stable as an okamisan. She is known to aid the wrestlers' recuperation after training by giving them massages. The couple have two children.

Career record

See also
Glossary of sumo terms
List of past sumo wrestlers
List of sumo elders
List of sumo tournament second division champions

References

External links

1968 births
Living people
Japanese sumo wrestlers
Sumo people from Gunma Prefecture